Sir Paul Hunter Adams  (born ) is a New Zealand businessman and philanthropist. In the 2015 New Year Honours, he was appointed a Companion of the New Zealand Order of Merit, for services to business and philanthropy. He was elevated to Knight Companion of the New Zealand Order of Merit, for services to philanthropy and the community, in the 2019 Queen's Birthday Honours.

References

New Zealand businesspeople
Knights Companion of the New Zealand Order of Merit
Businesspeople awarded knighthoods
Year of birth uncertain
Date of birth missing (living people)

1940s births

Living people